The Republican Court was a group of American political figures, intellectuals, and their spouses which formed in the late 1700s and early 1800s around the president and first lady of the United States. It centered around social gatherings at the home of George and Martha Washington in Philadelphia, and more broadly among the various social elite of the city. As an informal political association, it provided an important avenue for women to participate in discourse on political philosophy and matters of state.

The political climate at the time was later memorialized by Rufus Wilmot Griswold in his work, The Republican Court or American Society in the Days of Washington, published in 1855.

See also
 Colonial history of the United States
 Political culture of the United States
 Women in the American Revolution

References

External links
 Women of the Republican Court, from the Library Company of Philadelphia

Political history of the United States
History of the Thirteen Colonies
Women in the American Revolution